Shri Madhavnath Maharaj (1857–1936) was a Hindu saint, of Karvi, Chitrakoot, Madhya Pradesh, who continued the Nath Sampradaya of the famous Navnaths in India.

Birth and early life
Yogabhyanand Shri Madhavnath Maharaj was born on Shak 1779 Chaitra Shukla Pratipada, i.e. Thursday 26 March 1857 in Deshastha Brahmin family of Shrimati Mathurabai and Shri Malhardada Ratnaparkhi (Kulkarni) in Paangari, a village in Sinnar Taluka, District Nashik.

Siddhi
Shri Madhavnath Maharaj attained spiritual enlightenment in the Balaji temple which contains the samadhi of Shri. Guptanath. After that, Shri Madhavnath Maharaj when thirteen years old went on a journey which would take him to Badri-Kedar, Rameshwaram, the twelve jyotirlingas and the samadhi sthaan of the  Nava Natha's (nine masters). He followed a solitary strict penance for another six years in the Himalayas and  attained yogasiddhi. Shri Madhavnath Maharaj then went to Kashi, Trimbakeshwar, Nasik, Jalgaon, Manala, Amarkantak, Indore, Ujjain, Gwalior, Khaandwa, Chaalisgaon, Saptashrungi, and many other places where he blessed people and helped them lead a spiritual life. As a result, a vast shishya parampara was established which continues to grow to this day.

Work and social influence
Shri Madhavnath Maharaj spread the importance of Yoga and Naamasmaran throughout India. He blessed his followers to build the lakshmi-venkatesh temple at Rangaari, Devgaon in Aurangabad district. Shreenath temple was then built at Thorgavhaan in Jalgaon. With the help of Lakhsmibai halwai Shri Madhavnath Maharaj built the famous Dgadusheth Halwai Datta Mandir in Budhwaar Peth, Pune. Several temples were built in Indore, Trimbakeshwar in Nashik, Akola, Nagpur, Wardha, Hinganghat, Dhaar, Shiraale, Nandgaon, Kashi and other places which helped people attain the spiritual path.

References

Nathasampradaya, uday va vistaar - Dr. Prahlad Narhar Joshi
Shri Madhavnath Sanjeevani - B. Y. Vaavde, Shreenath Mandir Vishwast Mandal
Shrinath Deep Prakash - Nathsoot ( Ramchandra Kulkarni )
Shri Madhavnath Charit Navneet - Vishwanath Shankar Mahashabde
Shrinath Geetanjali - Nathsoot (Ramchandra Kulkarni )

External links
 Shree Nath Mandir Indore: http://www.nathmandirindore.org
 Shree Nath Mandir Nagpur: http://www.nathmandirnagpur.org

1857 births
1936 deaths
People from Nashik district
People from Madhya Pradesh
People from Nagpur district
19th-century Hindu religious leaders
20th-century Hindu religious leaders